Ransilu Jayathilake (born December 15, 1987) is a Sri Lankan leading Powerlifter, who has competed and won in Commonwealth and Asian competitions. Ransilu has won the Asian Championship 5 times in a row.

See also 
 List of powerlifters
 Weightlifting at the 2006 Asian Games – Men's 94 kg

References

External links 
 
 Open Powerlifting Record
 IPF - Open Powerlifting Record

1987 births
Living people
Sri Lankan powerlifters
Sri Lankan male weightlifters
Sinhalese sportspeople
Sri Lankan Christians